Robert Nuttall (1 May 1908 – 10 January 1983) was an English footballer who played as a winger or as a centre forward during his career. Born in Tottington, Lancashire, he began his playing career with his hometown club before joining Football League Third Division North side Nelson in February 1931. One of Nelson's final signings as a League club, Nuttall made his debut at left-half in the 2–5 defeat to York City on 21 March 1931. He played as a centre forward in the team's following match, a 0–3 defeat away at Rotherham United. After two games out of the side, he returned for the 1–3 defeat against Wigan Borough. Nuttall made his final Football League appearance on the penultimate match of the 1930–31 season, the 1–5 loss to Wrexham on 25 April 1931. At the end of the campaign, Nelson failed their re-election to the League and subsequently joined the Lancashire Combination.

Nuttall was one of the few players who remained at Seedhill following the descent into non-league football, staying with Nelson until November 1933. He subsequently joined Turton and spent two years with the club before returning to his place of birth to sign for amateur side Tottington St. John's in October 1935.

References

1908 births
1983 deaths
People from Tottington, Greater Manchester
English footballers
Association football defenders
Association football forwards
Nelson F.C. players
English Football League players